Dos hijos desobedientes (English: "Two Disobedient Sons") is a 1960 Mexican Western musical comedy film directed by Jaime Salvador and starring Pedro Armendáriz, Antonio Aguilar, Elvira Quintana and María Duval.

The film's sets were designed by art director Jesús Bracho.

Plot
Two brothers fight to buy a ranch, but the new owners are two young women with whom they fall in love. To buy the ranch and be able to marry them, they must learn to control their behavior.

Cast
Pedro Armendáriz as Pedro
Antonio Aguilar as Toño
Elvira Quintana as Elvira
María Duval as María
José Elías Moreno as Father Mariano
Jaime Fernández as Carmelo's Son
Armando Soto La Marina as Chicote (as Armando Soto Lamarina "El Chicote")
Federico Curiel as Fidencio (as Federico Curiel "Pichirilo")
Joaquín García Vargas as Bartolo (as Joaquin Garcia Vargas "Borolas")
Amparo Arozamena as Doña Catalina
José Eduardo Pérez as Carmelo's Son
José Jasso as Contest Judge
Manuel Arvide as Don Carmelo (uncredited)
Felipe de Flores (uncredited)
José Luis Fernández as Carmelo's Henchman (uncredited)
Salvador Lozano as Attorney (uncredited)
Roberto Meyer as Mayor (uncredited)
José Luis Moreno as Man Beaten at Party (uncredited)
Ángela Rodríguez as Pedro's Female Friend (uncredited)
Mario Sevilla as Don Leoncio (uncredited)

Production and release
The film was shot in 1958. It was released on 17 March 1960 on the Olimpia cinema, for four weeks.

References

External links

1960 musical comedy films
1960 films
1960s Western (genre) comedy films
Films directed by Jaime Salvador
Mexican musical comedy films
Mexican Western (genre) comedy films
1957 comedy films
1960s Mexican films
1950s Mexican films